Ray Mattox (March 10, 1927 – December 29, 2005) was an American politician. He served as a Democratic member for the 49th, 56th and 57th district of the Florida House of Representatives.

Mattox was born in Jesup, Georgia. He attended Florida Southern College, where he earned a bachelor's degree in business economics in 1951, and the University of Florida where he earned a law degree in 1954. He practised law in Winter Haven, Florida for 51 years. Mattox served in the United States Navy during World War II. He also served as a second lieutenant during the Korean War.

In 1957, Mattox was elected to the Florida House of Representatives, serving until 1976. He represented the 56th district from 1967 to 1968, the 57th district from 1968 to 1972, and the 49th district from 1972 to 1976.

Mattox was defeated for election to the Florida Senate in 1968 and the United States House of Representatives in 1976. He died in December 2005 of a heart attack in Winter Haven, Florida, at the age of 78.

References 

1927 births
2005 deaths
People from Jesup, Georgia
Democratic Party members of the Florida House of Representatives
20th-century American politicians
American lawyers
Florida Southern College alumni
University of Florida alumni
United States Army personnel of the Korean War